General Sir Alfred Hastings Horsford  (1818 – 13 September 1885) was a senior British Army officer who went on to be Military Secretary.

Military career
Born in Bath and educated at the Royal Military College, Sandhurst, Horsford was commissioned into the Rifle Brigade in 1833.

He served in the Cape Frontier War in 1847 and was Commanding Officer of 1st Bn the Rifle Brigade during the 8th Xhosa War in 1852.

He also served in the Crimean War and fought at the Battle of Alma, Battle of Inkerman, Battle of Balaklava and the early part of the Siege of Sevastopol.

He served in the repression of the Indian Mutiny, having been made Commander of the 6th Brigade at the Capture of Lucknow.

He was made Deputy Adjutant-General at Army Headquarters in 1860, a Brigade commander at Aldershot in 1866, Major-General on the General Staff at Malta in 1869 and General Officer Commanding South-Eastern District in January 1872. He went on to be Military Secretary in 1874.

In retirement he was involved in an accident when Frederick Gye, Manager of the Royal Italian Opera, was assisting Horsford over a fence. Horsford's gun went off and shot Gye in the eye.

References

|-
 

|-

|-

|-

1818 births
1885 deaths
People from Bath, Somerset
British Army generals
Knights Grand Cross of the Order of the Bath
Rifle Brigade officers
British Army personnel of the Crimean War
British military personnel of the Indian Rebellion of 1857
Burials at Kensal Green Cemetery
Military personnel from Somerset